Rancho Los Alamos y Agua Caliente was a   Mexican land grant in present day Kern County, California given in 1846 by Governor Pio Pico to Francisco Lopes, Luis Jordan and Vicente Botiller. The name means "Cottonwoods and Hot Springs Ranch" in Spanish. The native riparian Fremont Cottonwood (Populus fremontii) grow around natural springs.  Rancho Los Alamos y Agua Caliente lay between two other Mexican Land Grants in the Tehachapi Mountains, Rancho El Tejon and Rancho Castac.  The rancho is now a part of the  Tejon Ranch.

History
A grant was made to Pedro Carrillo by Governor Manuel Micheltorena in 1843, that included Hungry Valley, Cañada de los Alamos and Peace Valley, the later area of the Hungry Valley State Vehicular Recreation Area, Gorman and the Tejon Pass (then called Portezuela de Castac or Castac Pass),  but Carrillo failed to comply with any of its conditions.  In 1846, Governor Pío Pico declared that, "Taking into consideration the seven months granted to citizen Pedro Carrillo to stock the land granted to him in conformity with the colonization laws, and of the injury caused to the industry of the country on account of his not occupying it, the denunciation of the tract of the Alamos and Agua Caliente in favor of the applicants may take place, to whom the proper title shall be issued," and on the same day a title was issued to them. The grant was patented to Agustín Olvera in 1866.  This grant covered a different section of land than the first. 

In 1865 Edward Beale purchased Rancho los Alamos y Agua Caliente  from Agustín Olvera, Cristobal Aguilar, and James L. Gibbens.  Beale would acquire three other Mexican Land Grants (Rancho El Tejon, Rancho Castac and Rancho La Liebre) to create the present day Tejon Ranch.

References

See also
Ranchos of California
List of Ranchos of California 
 

Alamos y Agua Caliente, Los
Los Alamos y Agua Caliente
San Emigdio Mountains
Tehachapi Mountains
History of the San Joaquin Valley
Mountain Communities of the Tejon Pass
Los Alamos y Agua